Umarex air pistols are air gun replicas of handguns manufactured by Umarex Sportwaffen of Germany under license from the manufacturers of the original firearms.

They are imported into the United States by Umarex USA, Inc..

Design
Umarex air pistols are firearm replicas that are operated by disposable carbon dioxide cylinders. They fire .177 caliber airgun pellets or steel BBs. Depending on the model, these air pistols use removable 8-round or 10-round rotary magazines or drop-out magazines that eject from the bottom of the grip. Velocity ranges from 295 -  depending on model and ammo type.

Umarex produces .177 caliber  operated versions of Beretta, Walther, Colt, Glock, Heckler & Koch, Magnum Research and Smith & Wesson pistols. They are made to almost the same specifications as the firearm in looks and weight. Some of them function the same in that their slides cycle or recoil.

One of the downsides to any  operated pistol is that when the carbon dioxide cylinder gets cold due to pressure loss as a result of rapid fire, the pistol's velocity will drop.

Use
These pistols are used for training and informal target practice (plinking) where it would be unsuitable to train with a center fire pistol. They are economical to shoot compared to a firearm. They have also become collectors items and show pieces.

Umarex air pistols are replicas of real firearms and are not toys. They are intended to be used under the supervision of an experienced adult shooter and all airguns must be treated with the same respect given a firearm with regard to safety.

Operation

All the pellet pistols, with the exception of the Desert Eagle, use standard revolver operation. The  
pistol can either be fired double action, or the hammer can be cocked after each shot for single action. The Desert Eagle cocks its hammer and rotates the magazine automatically after each shot, although the first shot can be either single or double action, as above.

Models

Pellet Pistols
Walther CP 88, CP99
Beretta (Beretta 92), Px4 Storm
Colt (M1911)
Smith & Wesson (586 (features 10-shot magazine)
Magnum Research, Inc (Desert Eagle (Blowback 8 shot)

BB Pistols
Walther CP99 Compact, PPK/S  
Magnum Research, Inc Baby (Mini) Desert Eagle
Glock 17 Gen3, 17 Gen4, 19 Gen3, 19 Gen4
Heckler & Koch VP9
Beretta Elite II, Px4 Storm, M84FS, M92 A1
Smith & Wesson M&P (Military and Police)

See also
Air gun

Pneumatic weapons